The 1967 Atlantic hurricane season was the first Atlantic hurricane season to be part of the modern-day satellite era. With 13 named storms, it was an above average season in terms of named storms, slightly above average in terms of hurricanes (6), and below average in terms of major hurricanes, with only one; Beulah. The season began on June 1, 1967, and ended on November 30, 1967, which delimits the time boundaries when tropical cyclones in the North Atlantic Ocean typically form. The first depression originated on June 10, and the final storm – Heidi – lost tropical characteristics on October 31.

Hurricane Beulah – the strongest storm of the season – was also the most damaging, causing 59 deaths and $235 million in damage (1967 USD) along its two-week-long path. Beulah formed on September 5 and soon after crossed southern Martinique into the Caribbean Sea. On the island, it dropped  of rainfall in Les Anses-d'Arlet, causing severe flooding. Widespread evacuations occurred along the southern coast of the Dominican Republic due to fears of a repeat of Hurricane Inez from the previous year. After brushing the south coast of Hispaniola, the hurricane weakened and re-intensified, striking the Yucatán Peninsula and later near the United States/Mexico border. There, it caused severe river flooding, killing 34 people in the two countries.

Hurricanes Arlene and Chloe, as well as several tropical depressions, originated from tropical waves that left the coast of Africa. Chloe lasted for nearly 17 days, eventually dissipating over France after wrecking a ship offshore northern Spain, killing 14 people. Hurricane Doria co-existed with Beulah and Chloe, taking an unusual trajectory over the eastern United States; it killed three people in a boating accident offshore New Jersey. In late September, Tropical Storm Edith was a minimal storm that moved through the Lesser Antilles without serious impact. Hurricane Fern killed three people when it struck Mexico north of Tampico. Tropical Storm Ginger existed in the far eastern Atlantic in early October, and Hurricane Heidi stalled over the northern Atlantic Ocean since formation and dissipated at the dead end of the month. No tropical cyclones formed in November.

Season summary 

The season began on June 1, which was the date when the National Hurricane Center (NHC) activated radar stations across the Caribbean and Gulf of Mexico. The season ended on November 30, which ended the conventional delimitation of the time period when most tropical cyclones form in the Atlantic basin. At the end of the season, NHC director Gordon Dunn retired and was replaced by Robert Simpson. For the first time in 1967, the NHC tracked weaker, developing tropical disturbances, observing that 90% of systems do not develop. Tropical cyclogenesis – the process in which a tropical cyclone develops – resulted mainly from tropical waves, the Intertropical Convergence Zone (ITCZ), and decaying frontal systems. There were 30 tropical waves that exited the west coast of Africa at Dakar, Senegal, of which 14 became tropical depressions. Another 20 tropical disturbances originated offshore the Mid-Atlantic states, and 7 disturbances derived from cold-core lows.

The first named storm – Arlene – did not form until August 28 and became a hurricane on September 2. At the time, only seven known seasons began later, although 1967 would the most active among these late starting seasons. The latency was caused by a stronger than normal ridge across the Atlantic Ocean, which suppressed convective activity across the basin and prevented the formation of strong low pressure areas. Eight of those depressions would go on to reach higher intensities. It was the first year that the NHC tracked the weaker depressions. Operationally, the agency followed and numbered 23 depressions, and discovered in a post-season analysis that another three systems became depressions. Eight depressions attained gale-force winds and were named from a sequential list, and six storms intensified to hurricane-strength – .

Systems

Tropical Storm One

Satellite imagery and ship data indicated that Subtropical Depression Three formed at 18:00 UTC on June 14 to the northeast of the northeastern Bahamas, associated with an upper-level low. With a ridge to the northeast, the depression moved northwestward toward the Southeastern United States. Conditions were not favorable for strengthening, with cool air and minimal outflow, although the cyclone acquired gale-force winds by 12:00 UTC on August 16, becoming a subtropical storm. Shortly thereafter the system's circulation contracted, indicative of a transition to tropical status 12 hours later. An approaching cold front turned the system northeastward on June 18. Weakening to a depression as it headed inland, the cyclone lost tropical characteristics by 12:00 UTC on June 19. Having transitioned into an extratropical storm, its remnants continued to the northeast, restrengthening slightly to  a day later. Early on June 22, the system was absorbed by the front, and continued to the northeast into Nova Scotia.

Tropical Storm Two

In mid-June, a lingering trough produced disorganized convection across the eastern Gulf of Mexico and western Atlantic. An area of low pressure developed northeast of Florida and gradually organized into a tropical depression around 00:00 UTC on June 20. The system gradually weakened beginning on June 22 and dissipated after 12:00 UTC on June 23 as it moved toward the east.

Hurricane Arlene 

Following a series of weak tropical depressions emerging from the west coast of Africa, the ITCZ became more active at the end of August. A tropical wave exited the coast of Africa on August 24, and by the next day, a Pan American flight observed a circulation with falling pressures. Steered by a strong ridge to its northeast, the nascent system tracked northwestward, strengthening into a tropical storm by 18:00 UTC on the following day. After two ships reported gale-force winds, the NHC began issuing advisories on Tropical Storm Arlene at 08:00 UTC on August 30.

Arlene failed to intensify much for nearly three days while passing through the Mid-Atlantic upper-level trough, although its wind speeds eventually increased. On September 2, Arlene turned to the north due to an approaching trough moving eastward from the Northeastern United States. The storm's convection wrapped around the center and organized further as Arlene progressed northward. Turning to the northeast, the storm attained hurricane status by 18:00 UTC. Soon after, the storm transitioned into an extratropical cyclone, and was absorbed by the trough late on September 5 to the southeast of Newfoundland.

Tropical Storm Four

A tropical wave moved off Africa on August 28, spawning a large area of disorganized convection as it moved west. The system became much better organized on September 1, and it developed into a tropical depression around 12:00 UTC that day. Moving along the Intertropical Convergence Zone, the cyclone further developed into a tropical storm winds of  winds on September 3. Satellite imagery showed a compact storm with organized convection near its center. However, it began to weaken on September 4, and it dissipated over the central Atlantic after 18:00 UTC on September 5. The remnants of the storm may have been absorbed into the large circulation of Chloe to the east.

Hurricane Chloe 

On September 4, a tropical wave exited the west coast of Africa, and by 18:00 UTC organized into Tropical Depression Eight between Cabo Verde and Senegal. Soon after, the depression moved through Cabo Verde, and it continued northwestward due to a passing mid-latitude trough. On September 6, the depression intensified into Tropical Storm Chloe, but its intensity stabilized for the next three days. Maintaining intensity over the following day, Chloe turned sharply westward. By 12:00 UTC on September 11 Chloe attained hurricane status; around that time interaction with Hurricane Doria to the west turned Chloe more toward the northwest. Due to the sparse observations in the area, it is possible that Chloe briefly reached major hurricane intensity, but data were insufficient for such an upgrade.

After maintaining peak winds for about 48 hours, Chloe weakened somewhat early on September 15, while still over the open waters of the east-central Atlantic Ocean. By 12:00 UTC the cyclone briefly dipped below Category 2 on the Saffir–Simpson scale, but re-intensified to recover its former status 12 hours later. Over the next three days the westerlies turned Chloe east-northeastward, but the storm maintained winds of  during this timeframe. On September 18 the storm was last intercepted by the Hurricane Hunters southeast of Newfoundland. By 12:00 UTC on September 19 Chloe finally began to lose its strength, and a day later degenerated into a tropical storm. Chloe transitioned into an extratropical cyclone containing gales on September 21. On the same date, the extratropical remnants of Chloe reached the coastline of France near Bordeaux and quickly dissipated inland over central France. Off the northern coast of A Coruña, Spain, high waves from Chloe sank the Fiete Schulze – a German cargo ship attempting to circumnavigate the storm. Of the 42 person crew, 14 people drowned, and the others were rescued and brought to a West German hospital, sparking fear of kidnapping from the East German government.

Hurricane Beulah 

A tropical wave exited the coast of Africa on August 28. On September 7, the depression intensified into Tropical Storm Beulah, which crossed into the Caribbean Sea that day. An anticyclone over the Bahamas turned the hurricane westward, as changing upper-level conditions from a passing trough to the north, as well as land interaction with Hispaniola, greatly weakened Beulah. The track shifted to the southwest and weakened further to a tropical storm.

On September 13, Beulah began a steady track to the northwest while passing south of Jamaica. On the next day, it re-intensified into a hurricane due to favorable conditions, strengthening to a major hurricane by September 17. After weakening over land, Beulah restrengthened over the warm waters of the Gulf of Mexico, attaining peak winds of  early on September 20, making it a Category 5 on the Saffir-Simpson scale. The pressure may have been lower between those passes around 00:00 UTC on that day as a result. It weakened quickly over land and stalled near Alice, Texas, before turning to the southwest and dissipating over Nuevo León on September 22.

On Martinique, Beulah dropped  of rainfall in Les Anses-d'Arlet. Flooding rains damaged roads, bridges, and houses on Martinique and neighboring Saint Lucia. In the Lesser Antilles, Beulah caused $7.65 million in damage and 17 deaths. The storm caused minor damage and one death in southern Puerto Rico. After the severe impacts of Hurricane Inez a year prior, about 200,000 people evacuated the southern coast of the Dominican Republic. There, Beulah left heavy damage to roads, bridges, and the banana and coffee crops, but the evacuations led to a low death toll of two in the nation. Minor water damage occurred along Haiti's southern Tiburon Peninsula. On Cozumel, Beulah's strong winds destroyed 40% of the houses and heavily damaged many hotels, severely impacting the tourism industry. Along the northern Yucatán Peninsula, the winds wrecked a clock tower in Tizimín, killing five. The rains caused record river flooding, with a peak crest of  along the San Antonio River at Goliad. In northeastern Mexico, Beulah killed 19 people, left 100,000 people homeless, and caused $26.9 million in damage. In Texas, damage reached $200 million, and there were 15 deaths, 5 of whom related to a then-record-breaking tornado outbreak that generated 115 tornadoes.

Hurricane Doria 

A decaying cold front led to Subtropical Storm Nine developing on September 6 off the Southeastern United States. It briefly weakened to a tropical storm on September 11, but by the next day had already re-strengthened into a hurricane. On September 16, the hurricane weakened to tropical storm status to the south of New Jersey. Having degenerated into a remnant low-pressure area on September 19, it crossed over its former path before turning eastward, dissipating on September 21 southwest of Bermuda. Doria left $150,000 in minor coastal damage and killed three people when capsizing a boat offshore Ocean City, New Jersey.

Tropical Storm Eight

A convectively active tropical wave moved off the western coast of Africa on September 22. It tracked westward, remaining disorganized until September 25, when it developed into a tropical depression around 00:00 UTC. The small system harbored organized convection over its center, which was the basis for upgrading it to a tropical storm on September 27. By September 30, the storm began to become less organized while it slowed in forward motion, a trend that caused the cyclone to dissipate after 12:00 UTC on October 1.

Tropical Storm Edith 

A tropical disturbance moved westward from the African coast on September 20. At 21:00 UTC, the NHC issued their first advisory, naming the system Edith. A nearby ship reported  waves on September 27, potentially indicating stronger winds during periods without meteorological observations, although unfavorable conditions prevented initial development. It was not until 12:00 UTC that Edith attained tropical storm force winds. The storm failed to intensify due to its proximity to a cold upper-level trough and releasing too much latent heat. On September 30, Edith passed over Dominica as a weakened tropical storm and dissipated the next day over the eastern Caribbean Sea. It caused gusty winds and minor damage during its passage through the Lesser Antilles.

Hurricane Fern 

Toward the end of September, a powerful cold front moved through the Gulf of Mexico and stalled over the Bay of Campeche. Convection persisted across the region as the surface pressure dropped. As the system organized more, it tracked northward, although a ridge to the north steered the nascent system to the west. On October 2, the British ship Plainsman observed gale-force winds, prompting the NHC to upgrade the depression to Tropical Storm Fern. Upwelling and cold air left in the wake of Hurricane Beulah caused Fern to weaken slightly as it approached the Gulf Coast of Mexico. It rapidly weakened over land, dissipating by 18:00 UTC.

Fern's landfall was accompanied by an area of heavy rainfall that extended into the mountainous areas of Veracruz. The rains caused additional flooding along the Pánuco River, which became swollen during Hurricane Beulah two weeks prior. Three people drowned in the floodwaters. Damage was minor related to Fern. Along the lower Texas coast, the threat from Fern spurred high tide and small craft warnings from the National Weather Service. Additional members of the Texas National Guard, in place after Beulah, were activated due to the threat from Fern.

Tropical Storm Ginger 

An area of convection developed off the west coast of Africa following the westward passage of Tropical Depression Sixteen. On October 5, it is estimated that Tropical Depression Seventeen developed from this system, based on the convective appearance on satellite imagery. Three ships reported  winds on October 6, which was the basis for the NHC upgrading it to Tropical Storm Ginger, in conjunction with data from Cabo Verde. Instead, the Rota, Spain Naval Fleet Station issued gale warnings in relation to the storm. On October 7, the storm curved west-southwestward and quickly weakened into a tropical depression. Ginger dissipated on October 8 to the north of Cabo Verde.

Tropical Storm Twelve

A tropical wave moved through the northeastern Caribbean on October 10, with a large area of associated thunderstorms. The wave interacted with a stalled frontal boundary, developing a broad circulation by October 13 to the northeast of the Bahamas. A day later, the system developed into a subtropical storm – its classification was because the system was co-located with a trough. There was another area of convection along the front northeast of the subtropical storm, which accelerated northeastward. Meanwhile, the subtropical storm turned westward. It had a small circulation with thunderstorms sheared north of the center, which gradually became more organized. On October 17, an approaching front turned the storm northward and later northeastward. On the same day, the subtropical storm transitioned into a tropical cyclone. The storm later moved over Atlantic Canada and was ultimately absorbed by the cold front on October 19.

Hurricane Heidi 

An area of convection persisted on October 16 between the Lesser Antilles and Cabo Verde. At the time, the system was not named due to the lack of a warm thermal core, although it was later assessed as a tropical storm as of 18:00 UTC that day. On October 21, the Hurricane Hunters observed a weak circulation with winds of only . At the same time, the storm was located along the edge of a baroclinic zone, which limited strengthening. That day, data from the Hurricane Hunters observed a warm core, and the NHC classified the system as Tropical Storm Heidi. The storm was more of a hybrid storm initially, with the strongest winds near the center, spurring gale warnings for Bermuda. However, winds there only reached about  during the storm's passage.

The NHC initially anticipated that Heidi would become extratropical within two days. Early on October 23, the agency upgraded the storm to hurricane status about 105 mi (175 mi) southeast of Bermuda. Heidi moved quickly eastward with the approaching trough until October 25, when a building ridge caused the hurricane to move slowly northeastward in an area of light wind shear. Early on October 26, Heidi attained peak winds of  about halfway between Bermuda and the Azores. By the next day, the hurricane had become much larger, with characteristics of an extratropical storm despite maintaining the warm thermal core. After stalling on October 29, Heidi turned westward and weakened to tropical storm status. Another approaching trough turned the storm back to the northeast on October 31. Later that day, Heidi started losing tropical characteristics, transitioning into an extratropical cyclone by November 1. Later that day, the remnants of Heidi were absorbed into the prevailing weather conditions of the north Atlantic Ocean.

Other systems 

On June 10, the first tropical depression of the season developed in the western Caribbean Sea. It moved northwestward, dissipating over the eastern Yucatán Peninsula on June 12. A tropical wave exited Senegal on September 18 and progressing westward near Cabo Verde. A day later, it developed into a tropical depression. It moved across the Atlantic, dissipating on September 27 after entering the eastern Caribbean. Another tropical wave exited Africa on September 25. A day later, it became a tropical depression while moving near Cabo Verde. It dissipated on September 28. From October 7–10, a tropical depression existed in the western Atlantic. From October 15–17, a tropical depression existed in the central Atlantic.

Storm names 
The following names were used for named storms (tropical storms and hurricanes) that formed in the North Atlantic in 1967. Storms were named Chloe, Doria, Fern, Ginger and Heidi for the first time in 1967.

Retirement 

At the end of the season, the name Beulah was retired and replaced with Beth in 1971.

Season effects 
The following table lists all of the storms that have formed in the 1967 Atlantic hurricane season. It includes their duration, names, landfall(s) (in parentheses), damages, and death totals. Deaths in parentheses are additional and indirect (an example of an indirect death would be a traffic accident), but were still related to that storm. Damage and deaths include totals while the storm was extratropical, a wave, or a low, and all of the damage figures are in 1967 USD.

Contemporaneous seasons 
 1967 Pacific hurricane season
 1967 Pacific typhoon season
 1966–67/1967–68 South-West Indian Ocean cyclone season

See also 

 Australian region cyclone seasons: 1966–67 1967–68
 South Pacific cyclone seasons: 1966–67 1967–68
 South-West Indian Ocean cyclone seasons: 1966–67 1967–68

Notes

External links 
 Monthly Weather Review